Our Lady of La Salette Church may refer to:

 Our Lady of La Salette Church, Paris
 Our Lady of La Salette Church, Rome